Professor Peter Gray (born in Sydney in 1946) is a bioengineer who has played a key role in the development of modern industrial biotechnology in Australia. He was Professor and Head of Biotechnology at the University of New South Wales (UNSW), Sydney, from 1988 – 2003, and was the inaugural Director of the Australian Institute for Bioengineering and Nanotechnology (AIBN) at The University of Queensland in Brisbane, Australia from 2003 – 2015.

Biography 

Gray completed his university studies at The University of Sydney, graduating in 1966 with a degree in chemical engineering and biosciences with honours. He completed his PhD at the University of New South Wales (UNSW) in 1970, studying the dynamics of protein synthesis in yeast growing in steady state continuous cultures.

Gray undertook postdoctoral research as a Science Research Fellow at University College London (UCL) in the group of Professors Malcolm Lilly and Peter Dunnill. The group was receiving major funding to investigate the application of immobilised enzymes processes for industrial bioprocessing. While at UCL, Gray carried out research on a number of unit operations required for the large scale production of bioactive proteins production by bacteria, unit operations which subsequently became widely used for the production of proteins made using recombinant DNA (rDNA) technology. He then moved to the United States to work for Eli Lilly and Co, Indianapolis, Indiana, as a Senior Scientist. At Lilly’s he was responsible for developing production scale antibiotic fermentations. Lilly’s was one of the first companies to link the new knowledge of microbial genetics with bioengineering to improve the strains and bioprocesses used for antibiotic production.

After five years overseas, Gray returned to Australia in 1975 to take up an academic position in the School of Biotechnology at UNSW, where his research resulted in the development of novel cyclic fed –batch bioprocesses for antibiotic production which markedly extended the productivity of the cultures. Gray returned to the US in 1982 where he worked for the Cetus Corporation and was a Visiting Professor at the University of California, Berkeley. Cetus was one of the first biotechnology companies developing products based on recombinant DNA technology, and pioneering the use of mammalian cell culture to express large complex biologics such as antibodies.

On returning to UNSW, Gray introduced research to Australia into the use of mammalian cell cultures such as CHO cells to produce, using r-DNA technology, large complex proteins. With Professor Les Lazarus and John Shine at the Garvan Institute of Medical Research he was responsible for the first locally produced recombinant DNA derived protein to enter human clinical trials in Australia, human growth hormone. In 1984 he was a founder of the Australian Biotechnology Association, which subsequently became AusBiotech, and was one of its early Presidents.

In 1988 he was appointed as Professor of Biotechnology and Head of the Department of Biotechnology at UNSW, positions that he held for over fourteen years, and led this department to be the national research leader in the field. He established and was Director of, the Bioengineering Centre at UNSW.

In 1992 Gray became a Fellow of the Australian Academy of Technological Sciences and Engineering (ATSE). He has been active in the activities of the Academy since, currently serving as Vice-President with responsibilities which include championing ATSE push for role of technology led innovation in enhancing Australia’s prosperity. He is Chair of the ATSE Steering Committee pushing for the introduction of a ‘Knowledge Transfer Metric’ to stimulate increased public/private research collaboration in Australia. He is also a Fellow of the Australian Institute of Company Directors.

He serves on the Boards of: BioPharmaceuticals Australia Pty Ltd; Engineering Conferences International (ECI) Inc, New York; ACYTE Biotechnology Pty Ltd, the UQ Diamantina Institute (UQDI), and on a number of state and federal  government committees in the fields of biotechnology, pharmaceuticals and education. Gray is an active researcher who has published and patented widely in the fields of bioengineering, the production of biopharmaceuticals and stem cell technology. He holds an Honorary Professorship from Fudan University in Shanghai, one of China’s leading universities.

Australian Institute for Bioengineering and Nanotechnology (AIBN) 

In 2003 Gray was appointed the Inaugural Director of the Australian Institute for Bioengineering and Nanotechnology (AIBN) and Professor of Bioengineering by The University of Queensland, Brisbane, Australia. Under his tenure the institute grew of more than 500 people with an annual turnover of AUD$40 million, which is now known nationally and internationally as an institute with sustained multi-disciplinary research excellence, and strong collaborative links to leading global research groups and corporations. In September 2015 it was announced that Professor Gray would step down from the role of AIBN Director, to be succeeded by Professor Alan Rowan.

Research 

Gray has been leading figure of antibody development using mammalian cell lines and stem cell bioprocesses.

His work helped to lure attract AUD$17 million in seed funding from the Queensland Government and Australian Government in 2011 to establish a facility in the state run by DSM Biologics. At the announcement attended by former Queensland Premier Anna Bligh, Professor Gray said, "The collaboration with DSMB will ensure that Australian bioresearchers will be able to rapidly progress their therapeutic leads into high purity material ready for evaluation in the clinic."

Gray has also helped to manufacture an antibody against Hendra virus on licence from the Henry Jackson Foundation, Uniformed Services University. The antibody entered phase 1 clinical trials in 2015. The work is the first clinical trial for a Hendra virus treatment. The work has led to further collaborations to develop an antibody for Middle East respiratory syndrome coronavirus

References 

Australian bioengineers
Scientists from Sydney
Academic staff of the University of New South Wales
University of Sydney alumni
1946 births
Living people
Fellows of the Australian Institute of Company Directors